The River Tyne  is a river in North East England. It is formed by the North Tyne and the South Tyne, which converge at Warden Rock near Hexham in Northumberland at a place dubbed 'The Meeting of the Waters'.
 

Course

North Tyne
The North Tyne rises on the Scottish border, north of Kielder Water. It flows through Kielder Forest, and in and out of the border. It then passes through the village of Bellingham before reaching Hexham.

South Tyne
The South Tyne rises on Alston Moor, Cumbria and flows through the towns of Haltwhistle and Haydon Bridge, in a valley often called the Tyne Gap. Hadrian's Wall lies to the north of the Tyne Gap. Coincidentally, the source of the South Tyne is very close to those of the Tees and the Wear. The South Tyne Valley falls within the North Pennines Area of Outstanding Natural Beauty (AONB) – the second largest of the 40 AONBs in England and Wales.

Tyne
To the east of Gateshead and Newcastle, the Tyne divides Hebburn and Jarrow on the south bank from Walker and Wallsend on the north bank. The Tyne Tunnel runs under the river to link Jarrow and Wallsend. Finally the river flows between South Shields and Tynemouth into the North Sea.

Geography
Thomas John Taylor (1810–1861) theorised that the main course of the river anciently flowed through what is now Team Valley, its outlet into the tidal river being by a waterfall at Bill Point (in the area of Bill Quay). His theory was not far from the truth, as there is evidence that prior to the last ice age, the River Wear once followed the current route of the lower River Team and merged with the Tyne at Dunston. Ice diverted the course of the Wear to its current location, flowing east the course of the Tyne) and joining the North Sea at Sunderland.

The River Tyne is estimated to be around 30 million years old.

Conservation history
The conservation of the Tyne has been handled by various bodies over the past 500 years. Conservation bodies have included: Newcastle Trinity House, and the Tyne Improvement Commission. The Tyne Improvement Commission conservation lasted from 1850 until 1968. The 1850–1950 era was the worst period for pollution of the river. The Tyne Improvement Commission laid the foundations for what has become the modern day Port of Tyne. Inside these 70 years, the two Tyne piers were built; Northumbrian, Tyne and Albert Docks were built, as well as the staithes at Whitehill and Dunston. This infrastructure enabled millions of tonnes of cargo to be handled by the Port by 1910. 
The tidal river has been managed by the Port of Tyne Authority since 1968.

Port of Tyne

With its proximity to surrounding coalfields, the Tyne was a major route for the export of coal from the 13th century until the decline of the coal mining industry in North East England in the second half of the 20th century. The largest coal staithes (a structure for loading coal onto ships) were located at Dunston in Gateshead, Hebburn and Tyne Dock, South Shields. The wooden staithes at Dunston, built in 1890, have been preserved, although they were partially destroyed by fire in 2006 and then a further fire in May 2020 means that the Staithes is becoming more vulnerable to vandalism and would need extensive financing to preserve it and make it secure. In 2016, Tyne Dock, South Shields was still involved with coal, importing 2 million tonnes of shipments a year. The lower reaches of the Tyne were, in the late 19th and early 20th centuries, one of the world's most important centres of shipbuilding, and there are still shipyards in South Shields and Hebburn to the south of the river. To support the shipbuilding and export industries of Tyneside, the lower reaches of the river were extensively remodelled during the second half of the 19th century, with islands (including Kings Meadow, the largest) removed and meanders in the river straightened.

Name and etymology
The Vedra on the Roman map of Britain may be the Tyne, or may be the River Wear. Ptolemy's Tína could be a "misplaced reference" to either this river or the Tyne in East Lothian. There is a theory that  was a word that meant "river" in the local Celtic language or in a language spoken in England before the Celts came: compare Tardebigge.

A supposed pre-Celtic root *tei, meaning 'to melt, to flow' has also been proposed as an etymological explanation of the Tyne and similarly named rivers, as has a Brittonic derivative of Indo-European *teihx, meaning 'to be dirty' (Welsh tail, 'manure').

River crossings

River Tyne

River North Tyne

River South Tyne

Tyne bridges in popular literature
LJ Ross' thriller Seven Bridges from the DCI Ryan series evolves around the Tyne bridges.

Artworks and sculpture

Newcastle-upon-Tyne

The river is represented, and personified, in a sculpture unveiled in 1968 as part of the new Civic Centre (seat of Newcastle City Council). Sculpted by David Wynne, the massive bronze figure incorporates flowing water into its design.

Salmon Trail
The Environment Agency is currently working with architects and cultural consultancy xsite, in collaboration with Commissions North, to create a travelling sculpture trail along the River Tyne.

The Tyne Salmon Trail will serve as a celebration of the river, its heritage and its increasingly diverse ecosystem. Historically a major symbol in the regional identity of the North East of England, the river plays host to a plethora of different species, the number of which is growing year on year in line with the rivers improving health.
The trail looks to capture the imagination of residents and tourists visiting the area – providing them with the ultimate 'fact finding' design experience, which celebrates the salmon's migratory journey in the Northeast of England.

FINS, REFLECTION and JOURNEY were the first three cubes to be launched in December 2007 from a family of ten. Each cube is inspired by the textures, changing colours, movement and journey of the salmon. With each offering a 'modern day keepsake' to take away, in the form of a designed Bluetooth message.

The other cubes will be moving along the River Tyne over one year visiting different locations from Kielder to the Mouth of the Tyne in the summer 2008 before starting their long journey back to their birthplace.

Conversation Piece

Bamboo Bridge
For three days, from 18 to 20 July 2008, a temporary bamboo artwork was installed over the Tyne close to the Gateshead Millennium Bridge. The Bambuco Bridge was created as part of that year's 'SummerTyne' festival.

Conservation
The River Tyne has a charity dedicated to protecting and enhancing its waters and surrounding areas. The Tyne Rivers Trust, established in 2004, is a community-based organisation that works to improve habitat, promote better understanding of the Tyne catchment area and build the reputation of the Tyne catchment as a place of environmental excellence.

See also

Association of Rivers Trusts
Port of Tyne, the commercial docks in and around the River Tyne in Tyne and Wear, England
Rivers of the United Kingdom
The Boat Race of the North, an annual series of races held on the Tyne between Durham and Newcastle universities 
Tyne-class lifeboats have been operated by the Royal National Lifeboat Institution since 1982
Tyne Valley, Prince Edward Island
Tyne, the name of one of the sea areas of the British Shipping Forecast.
Tuxedo Princess, moored floating nightclub (1983-2007)

References

Sources 
Leona J. Skelton.  Tyne after Tyne: An Environmental History of a River's Battle for Protection, 1529–2015.  Winwick White Horse Press, 2017.   .

External links

 Bridges On The Tyne
 Online Charts of The Tyne, to Newcastle

 
Rivers of Cumbria
Rivers of Northumberland
Rivers of Tyne and Wear
Geography of Newcastle upon Tyne